Siwa Prommas (born 6 October 1985) is a Thai professional footballer who plays as a left midfielder for the Thai League 2 club MOF Customs United.

External links
https://int.soccerway.com/players/siwa-prommas/447875/

1994 births
Living people
Siwa Prommas
Siwa Prommas
Association football midfielders
Siwa Prommas
Siwa Prommas
Siwa Prommas